

Notable alumni

Academia
 Ismar Schorsch (Class of 1957): Chancellor emeritus of The Jewish Theological Seminary (JTS) and the Rabbi Herman Abramovitz Professor of Jewish history.
 Jeff Trinkle (Class of 1979): professor and Chair of Computer Science at Rensselaer Polytechnic Institute; known for work in robotic manipulation, multibody dynamics, and automated manufacturing
 Robert Yerkes (Class of 1897): psychologist, ethologist and primatologist, worked in intelligence testing and field of comparative psychology; co-developer of Yerkes-Dodson law relating arousal to performance
 H. Craig Heller (Class of 1964): professor and chair of Biology at Stanford University; known for work in sleep, circadian rhythms, and thermoregulation

Arts
 Larry Crabb (Class of 1965): author and psychologist; founder and director of New Way Ministries
 Jacob G. Francis (Class of 1891): author, historian, Church of the Brethren pastor, founder of Elizabethtown College
 Sam Keen (Class of 1953): author, professor of philosophy and religion, and former contributing editor of Psychology Today
 J.D. Salinger (attended 1937-38): author, most known for The Catcher in the Rye, Raise High the Roof Beam, Carpenters and Seymour: An Introduction, Franny and Zooey and Nine Stories, a collection of short stories
 Linda Grace Hoyer Updike, (Class of 1923), author, mother of John Updike
 Wesley Updike, (Class of 1923) teacher, father of John Updike
 Lewis R. Linet, Jr. (Class of 1966): Founder of The Agency Of Ursinus College - Concert Production, Producer of The Philadelphia Folk Festival, Original Manager of Rock Group, KISS.

Athletics
 Reds Bassman: football player
 Steve Donahue (Class of 1984): men's head basketball coach at The University of Pennsylvania
 Tom Gormley (Class of 1917): player in American Professional Football League (which became the NFL in 1922) with Canton Bulldogs, Cleveland Tigers, Washington Senators and New York Brickley Giants
 Paul Guenther (Class of 1993): defensive coordinator for NFL's Oakland Raiders
 Jing Johnson (Class of 1916): pitched in Major League Baseball for Philadelphia Athletics
 Erma Keyes (1926–1999), All-American Girls Professional Baseball League player
 Dan Mullen (Class of 1994): Currently an analyst for ESPN; former head coach for University of Florida and  Mississippi State University football teams.
 Debbie Ryan (Class of 1975): former head coach for women's basketball team at University of Virginia; member of Women's Basketball Hall of Fame
 Bob Shoudt (Class of 1988): professional competitive eater, aka Notorious B.O.B.
 Dean Steward (Class of 1938): professional football player, member of "Steagles", team that resulted from temporary merger between Philadelphia Eagles and Pittsburgh Steelers due to league-wide manning shortages in 1943 brought on by World War II

Business
 Joseph DeSimone (Class of 1986): chemical engineer, CEO of Carbon; 2008 recipient of Lemelson–MIT Prize, 2016 recipient of National Medal of Technology and Innovation
 Cynthia Fisher (Class of 1983): biotechnology entrepreneur

Government and Public Service
 Alfred Alspach (Class of 1933): founder of Boys & Girls Club of Lancaster, Pennsylvania
 John R. Brooke, Union general of American Civil War and Spanish–American War
 Barrie Ciliberti (Class of 1957): Maryland House of Delegates legislator and Reagan administration appointee
 Ryan Costello (Class of 1999): former U.S. Representative for Pennsylvania's 6th congressional district (2015 to 2019)
 J. William Ditter Jr. (Class of 1943): Judge of the United States District Court for the Eastern District of Pennsylvania
 Hermann Eilts (Class of 1943): former United States Ambassador to Saudi Arabia and Egypt who assisted Henry Kissinger's Mideast shuttle diplomacy effort, worked with Egyptian President Anwar el-Sadat throughout the Camp David Accords, and dodged a Libyan hit team
 John Fichter (Class of 1975): Republican member of Pennsylvania House of Representatives
 George Geist (Class of 1977): Republican Party politician, who served in New Jersey State Senate
 Kim Guadagno (Class of 1980), former Lieutenant Governor of New Jersey
 Joseph Melrose (Class of 1966): former United States Ambassador to Sierra Leone
 Alan Novak (Class of 1971): attorney and former chairman of Republican State Committee of Pennsylvania
 William Preston Snyder, former president pro tempore of the Pennsylvania Senate and Pennsylvania Auditor General
 Linda M. Springer (Class of 1977): Director of United States Office of Personnel Management
Lloyd H. Wood: 20th Lieutenant Governor of Pennsylvania from 1951 to 1955

Science and Medicine
 Samuel Conway (Class of 1986): researcher in pharmaceutical, biomedical and agrochemical fields of organic chemistry, and major figure within furry fandom under the name Uncle Kage.
 Gerald Edelman (Class of 1950): winner of 1972 Nobel Prize in medicine
 Norman E. Gibbs (Class of 1964): software engineer, scholar and educational leader

Notable faculty
 Raymond Dodge, experimental psychologist: Appointed Professor of Philosophy in 1896
 Rene Joyeuse, M.D., MS, FACS (17 January 192012 June 2012) was a Swiss, French and American soldier, physician, researcher, and was a co-founder of the American Trauma Society who distinguished himself as an OSS agent/operator of Allied intelligence in German-occupied France during World War II. Taught French at the college (1941-1942)
 John Mauchly, American physicist who, along with J. Presper Eckert, designed ENIAC, the first general purpose electronic digital computer, as well as EDVAC, BINAC and UNIVAC I, the first commercial computer made in the United States. While Professor of Physics at Ursinus from 1933 to 1941, developed and tested digital electronic calculating devices at Ursinus's science labs in Pfahler Hall, a building which still stands on campus (see Gallery, below)
 Royal Meeker, statistician: Taught at Ursinus from 1906 until his appointment by President Wilson to be Commissioner of Labor Statistics in 1913. He later served (1923–24) as Pennsylvania Secretary of Labor and Industry
 Joseph Melrose, former U.S. Ambassador to Sierra Leone (1998-2001): Ambassador-in-Residence of the school's International Relations Program
 Deborah Poritz, jurist: Attorney General of New Jersey (1994–96), Chief Justice of the New Jersey Supreme Court (1996-2006): Taught English literature at Ursinus in the late 1960s

References

Ursinus College
Ursinus College